Leo Denis Barry (born August 7, 1943) is a Canadian jurist and current Justice of the Court of Appeal of Newfoundland and Labrador. He was born in Red Island, Newfoundland and Labrador.

Barry graduated from Memorial University (BA 1963, BSc 1962), Dalhousie Law School in 1967 and received a Masters (specialization in Jurisprudence and International Law) from Yale Law School in 1968.

Prior to his judicial career, Barry was a Newfoundland MHA and Liberal Party of Newfoundland and Labrador leader and Leader of the Opposition from 1984 until 1987 when he was forced to resign as party leader due to opposition by his caucus.

Barry was initially elected to the Newfoundland and Labrador House of Assembly as a Progressive Conservative in 1972. He served as Deputy Speaker of the House of Assembly before being appointed to the Cabinet of Frank Moores as Minister of Mines and Energy during which time he took a leading role in developing Newfoundland's oil and gas regulations. He was defeated in the 1975 provincial election and served as chairman of the Newfoundland Labor Relations Board for until 1977 when he became a lecturer at Dalhousie University's law school in Halifax. In 1979, Barry returned to Newfoundland and contested the leadership of the Progressive Conservative party placing third, losing to Brian Peckford. He won a seat during the 1979 provincial election and was appointed energy minister in Peckford's cabinet. Barry resigned from cabinet in 1981 due to a disagreement with Peckford over negotiations with the federal government over Newfoundland's claim to offshore resources. On Feb. 21, 1984, he crossed the floor to join the Liberal Party and became the party's leader later that year. As Liberal leader in the 1985 provincial election he increased the number of Liberal seats from four to 15 in the 52 member House of Assembly.

Despite his initial success in increasing the Liberal Party's position, he was seen as aloof and arrogant and was not popular with his caucus who saw him as unwilling to put all of his energy into the party. His position became less secure after the Liberals came in third place in two by-elections.

In February 1987, after Barry went on a week-long trip to Boston without informing his caucus, he returned to be handed a letter signed by all 14 of his caucus colleagues demanding a leadership convention. He initially refused to resign as party leader but agreed to allow a leadership convention in which he would be a candidate. He resigned as Leader of the Opposition on March 23, 1987 and then withdrew from the leadership race and resigned as party leader on April 28, 1987. Clyde Wells was elected party leader in June and went on to lead the Liberal Party to victory in the 1989 provincial election.

Barry returned to his legal practice and was appointed to the bench in 1989 becoming a judge of the Trial Division of the Supreme Court of Newfoundland and Labrador. In 2007, he was appointed a judge of the Court of Appeal of the Supreme Court of Newfoundland and Labrador.

Barry was a rumoured candidate to replace Supreme Court of Canada Justice Michel Bastarache. However, Prime Minister Stephen Harper nominated Thomas Cromwell of Nova Scotia to fill the vacancy.

Barry is one of two Court of Appeals judges to have been provincial MLA and provincial party leader; Clyde Wells, the former Chief Justice of the appeals court, is the other.

References

Judges in Newfoundland and Labrador
Living people
Lawyers in Newfoundland and Labrador
Canadian Rhodes Scholars
Progressive Conservative Party of Newfoundland and Labrador MHAs
Liberal Party of Newfoundland and Labrador MHAs
Members of the Executive Council of Newfoundland and Labrador
1943 births